Tenggara paradise flycatcher (Terpsiphone floris) is a species of bird in the family Monarchidae. It is native to Sumbawa, Alor, Lomblen and Flores islands in the Lesser Sundas. Formerly, it was considered a subspecies of the Blyth's paradise flycatcher until elevated to species rank by the IOC in 2021.

References

Terpsiphone
Birds described in 1894
Endemic fauna of Indonesia
Birds of the Lesser Sunda Islands
Taxa named by Johann Büttikofer